Rinnebach is a river of Thuringia, Germany. It is a right tributary of the Helme.

See also
List of rivers of Thuringia

References

Rivers of Thuringia
Rivers of Germany